Sonnenborgh Observatory (obs. code: 015) is an astronomical observatory and museum open to the public, located in Utrecht, Netherlands. It was founded in 1853 as a university observatory (of the University of Utrecht) and from 1854 until 1897 it was the first home of the Royal Dutch Meteorological Institute.

See also
 List of astronomical observatories
 List of astronomical societies
 Lists of telescopes

References

External links 
 Sonnenborgh Museum
  

Astronomical observatories in the Netherlands
Public observatories
Rijksmonuments in Utrecht (city)
Museums in Utrecht (city)
Science museums in the Netherlands
Buildings and structures in Utrecht (city)